The California School for the Deaf, Riverside (CSD-R or CSDR) is a school for deaf children located in Riverside, California. The school educates children from all over Southern California. Its companion school in Northern California is California School for the Deaf, Fremont (CSD-F or CSDF).

History 
On March 26, 1946, California Assembly Bill 75 was signed by Governor Earl Warren, future United States Supreme Court Chief Justice, authorizing appropriations to establish the Southern California School for the Deaf, later renamed the California School for the Deaf, Riverside.  In May, 1948, the State Department of Education in Sacramento chose Riverside as the site for the new school on the Arlington Avenue agricultural property.  The school began to accept students on February 2, 1953.  Perry E. Seely (1886–1949) (himself deaf) is the founding father of today's CSDR.

In 1951, Dr. Richard G. Brill became the school's first superintendent, a position he served for 26 years. In 1958, the student population reached 500.

In 1977, Dr. Robert Lennan became the second school superintendent. He oversaw implementation of an individualized education plan (IEP) as required by federal law.

In 1989, Dr. Kenneth Randall took over as the school's new head.

In 2000, Dr. Rachel Stone, became the fourth school chief, and the first deaf superintendent.

In 2001, Mr. Harold Kund became the fifth school superintendent. His administration period was characterized by a rebuilding program on campus. Kund retired in 2005.

In 2006, Mal Grossinger was selected as the sixth superintendent of CSDR. He was the second deaf superintendent to lead CSDR.

From 2014 to 2016, Scott Kerby, division director of State Special Schools, served as interim superintendent. He implemented new programs while conducting an intensive superintendent recruit process.

In 2016, Dr. Nancy Hlibok Amann, through an extensive community-based interview process, was selected to lead the school as its seventh superintendent. Dr. Amann comes from one of the Deaf community's best-known and celebrated families.

Admissions
Students may attend the school if their local school district refers them to CSDR. 11 counties are in CSDR's eligibility area.

Campus
The school has dormitory facilities. Students are eligible if the commute to and from the school is over one hour per direction.

Athletics
The school has an American football team, which uses American sign language to communicate on the field.

Notable alumni
 Sean Berdy, actor
 Ryan Lane, class of 2007; actor
 John Maucere, actor

See also

University High School (Irvine, California), which hosts Orange County's Regional Deaf and Hard of Hearing Program

References

External links 
California School for the Deaf, Riverside (CSDR)
California School for the Deaf, Riverside - Alumni Association
Articles about the school - Press Enterprise

Schools for the deaf in the United States
Education in Riverside, California
Public K-12 schools in California
Educational institutions established in 1953
Public boarding schools in the United States
Boarding schools in California
1953 establishments in California